The Golden Melody Awards, commonly abbreviated as GMA, is an honor awarded by Taiwan's Ministry of Culture to recognize outstanding achievement in the Mandarin, Taiwanese Hokkien, Hakka, and Formosan-languages popular and traditional music industry. The GMAs are awarded on the basis of votes by members of jury, and it has constantly been recognized as the equivalent to the Grammy Awards in Chinese-speaking world. It shares recognition of the music industry as that of the other performance awards such as the Golden Bell Awards (television) and the Golden Horse Awards (motion pictures).

The 1st Golden Melody Awards was held on January 6, 1990, to honor the popular music production by performers. Following the 1996 ceremony, the Ministry of Culture overhauled many Golden Melody Award categories for 1997.

In 1997, the awards were split into separate honors for popular music and traditional music. The two awards became distinct ceremonies in 2007. Starting in 2014, the Golden Melody Awards for traditional music has been awarded by the National Center for Traditional Arts, another division of the Ministry of Culture.

Both the 31st and 32nd edition of the awards ceremony was postponed to October 2020 and August 2021 respectively due to COVID-19 pandemic. The 33rd edition in the meantime, was held on July 2, 2022 at the Kaohsiung Arena in Kaohsiung, marking its return at Kaohsiung City since the 16th edition.

Ceremonies

Categories

Popular music

Vocal category – Record label awards
 Album of the Year (年度專輯獎)
 Song of the Year (年度歌曲獎)
 Best Mandarin Album (最佳華語專輯獎)
 Best Taiwanese Album (最佳台語專輯獎)
 Best Hakka Album (最佳客語專輯獎)
 Best Aboriginal Album (最佳原住民語專輯獎)
 Best Music Video (最佳音樂錄影帶獎)

Vocal category – Individual awards
 Best Composition (最佳作曲人獎)
 Best Lyrics (最佳作詞人獎)
 Best Music Arrangement (最佳編曲人獎)
 Producer of the Year, Album (最佳專輯製作人獎)
 Producer of the Year, Single (最佳單曲製作人獎)
 Best Male Mandarin Singer (最佳華語男歌手獎)
 Best Female Mandarin Singer (最佳華語女歌手獎)
 Best Male Taiwanese Singer (最佳台語男歌手獎)
 Best Female Taiwanese Singer (最佳台語女歌手獎)
 Best Hakka Singer (最佳客語歌手獎)
 Best Aboriginal Singer (最佳原住民語歌手獎)
 Best Band (最佳樂團獎)
 Best Vocal Group (最佳演唱組合獎)
 Best New Artist (最佳新人獎)

Instrumental category – Record label awards
 Best Instrumental Album (最佳專輯獎)

Instrumental category – Individual awards
 Producer of the Year, Instrumental (最佳專輯製作人獎)
 Best Instrumental Composition (最佳作曲人獎)

Technical category – Individual awards
 Best Album Design (最佳專輯裝幀設計獎)

Technical category – Record label awards
 Best Vocal Recording Album (最佳演唱錄音專輯獎)
 Best Instrumental Recording Album (最佳演奏錄音專輯獎)

Special awards
 Special Contribution Award (特別貢獻獎)
 Jury Award (評審團獎)

Traditional arts and music

Publishing category – Album awards
 Best Traditional Album (最佳傳統音樂專輯獎)
 Best Art Music Album (最佳藝術音樂專輯獎)
 Best Fusion Album (最佳跨界音樂專輯獎)
 Best Audiovisual Album (最佳傳統表演藝術影音出版獎)
 Best Religious Music Album (最佳宗教音樂專輯獎)

Publishing category – Individual awards
 Best Creation (最佳創作獎)
 Best Album Producer (最佳專輯製作人獎)
 Best Interpretation (最佳詮釋獎)
 Best Recording (最佳錄音獎)

Performance category
 Best Performance of the Year (最佳團體年度演出獎)
 Best New Artist (最佳個人表演新秀獎)
 Best Actor (Actress) of the Year (年度最佳演員獎)

Special award
 Lifetime Contribution Award (特別獎)

References

External links
 Official website at the Government Information Office
 Lists of nominees and winners over the years

 
Awards established in 1990